Gen. Walter Martin House is a historic home located at Martinsburg in Lewis County, New York. It was built in 1805 and consists of the original two story, hip roofed, stone Federal main block with Greek Revival wings added about 1835.  The front features a projecting center pavilion surmounted by a triangular pediment.  It was the home of General Walter Martin (1766–1834), founder and namesake of the town of Martinsburg.

It was listed on the National Register of Historic Places in 2008.

References

Houses on the National Register of Historic Places in New York (state)
Federal architecture in New York (state)
Houses completed in 1805
Houses in Lewis County, New York
1805 establishments in New York (state)
National Register of Historic Places in Lewis County, New York